Brachylaena neriifolia, commonly known as the Cape silver oak, water white alder or waterwitels, is a small tree which is native to river valleys in southern Africa.

It grows up to about 6 metres and is usually found along river banks or other moist areas. The leaves of this dioecious tree are lanceolate, and it bears cream-coloured flowers.

References

Brachylaena
Afromontane flora
Trees of South Africa